The J-series is Honda's fourth production V6 engine family introduced in 1996, after the C-series, which consisted of three dissimilar versions. The J-series engine was designed in the United States by Honda engineers. It is built at Honda's Anna, Ohio, and Lincoln, Alabama, engine plants.

It is a 60° V6 – Honda's existing C-series were 90° engines. Unlike the C series, the J-series has never been used in a longitudinal application; the J-series was specifically designed for transverse mounting. It has a shorter bore spacing, shorter connecting rods and a special smaller crankshaft than the C-series to reduce its size. All J-series engines are gasoline-powered, use four valves per cylinder, and have a single timing belt that drives the overhead camshafts. VTEC variable valve timing is used on almost all applications, with exceptions being the J30AC and J35Y8 (which use Variable Timing Control [VTC] instead).

One unique feature of some J-family engine models is Honda's Variable Cylinder Management (VCM) system. Initially, the system turns off one bank of cylinders under light loads, turning the V6 into a straight-3. Some versions were able to turn off one bank of cylinders or one cylinder on opposing banks, allowing for three-cylinder use under light loads and four-cylinder use under medium loads.

J25A
The J25A was used only in the Japanese domestic Inspire/Saber models. The J25A displaced . The J25A used a 10.5:1 compression ratio and was a SOHC VTEC design. It had a variable intake manifold to optimize torque output across varying engine speeds and engine response.

J25A 
 1998–2003 Honda Inspire
 1999 Honda Saber

J30A
The J30A displaces  and is a SOHC VTEC design. It weighs nearly  less and is an inch shorter than J30A1. This version was on the Ward's 10 Best Engines list for 2003 and 2004. The IMA hybrid version was on the list for 2005. In 2006 Honda created the J30A5 to mark the 30th anniversary of the Accord. According to Honda, horsepower gains were achieved with improvements to the airflow of the intake and exhaust system.

J30A 
 2004–2008 Honda Inspire
 Displacement: 
 Bore and stroke: 
 Power: 
 Torque: 
 Redline: 6,800 rpm
 Compression: 10.5:1

J30A1 
 1996–1999 Acura 3.0CL
 1997–2002 Honda Accord V6
 1999–2003 Honda Avancier

J30A3 
 1997–2002 Honda Accord V6
 1997–2003 Honda Odyssey (Prestige & Absolute models)

J30A4 
 2003–2005 Honda Accord V6

J30A5 
 2005–2007 Honda Accord V6
 2013–2016 Honda Accord (China only, with VCM ,261ps)
 Displacement: 
 Bore and stroke: 
 Power:  at 6244 rpm
 Torque:  at 5000 rpm
 Redline: 6,800 rpm
 Compression: 10.0:1
 Valve Train: 24-Valve SOHC i-VTEC

J30AC 
(Turbo)
 2021+ Acura TLX Type-S
 2022+ Acura MDX Type-S
 Displacement: 
 Bore and stroke: 
 Power:  at 5500 rpm
 Torque:  at 1400 rpm
 Compression: 9.8:1
 Valve Train: 24-Valve DOHC with VTC

J30Y1 
 2013–2018 Acura RDX (China)
 2017–2020 Acura MDX (Sport Hybrid)

JNA1 
 2005–2007 Honda Accord Hybrid
 Displacement: 
 Bore and stroke: 
 Power:  at 5400 rpm
 Torque:  at 4500 rpm
 Compression: 10.5:1
 Valve Train: 24-Valve SOHC i-VTEC

J32
The J32A displaces  and is a SOHC VTEC design. A more aggressive camshaft, more free flowing intake/exhaust, and a 2-stage intake manifold produced a  increase over the J32A1. The J32A3 includes a one-piece exhaust manifold cast with the cylinder head, first introduced on the J30A4.

J32A1 
  1999–2003 Acura TL
  2001–2003 Acura CL
 1998–2003 Honda Inspire

J32A2 
   2001–2003 Acura CL Type-S
   Bore and Stroke: 89mm x 86mm
   10.5:1 Compression
   2002–2003 Acura TL Type-S
   2002–2003 Honda Inspire Type-S

J32A3 
  2004–2008 Acura TL
3.2-liter SOHC V-6 aluminum alloy engine
Bore Stroke (All J32's) : 89mm x 86mm (3.5in x 3.386 in)
11:1 Compression (High Compression Piston Domes)
 2007–2008 (With revised bellhousing) Acura TL
Variable Valve Timing and Lift Electronic Control (VTEC)
Dual-stage induction system 
Cold-air intake system
Computer-controlled Programmed Fuel Injection (PGM-FI)
Direct ignition system
Unique exhaust manifolds that are cast directly into the head
High flow close-coupled catalytic converters
 VTEC engagement: 4,700 rpm

J35

J35A
The J35A is a SOHC VTEC design. Its weight is  running. The Honda Marine BF200-series marine engine shares its internals with the J35A.

J35A1
1999–2001 Honda Odyssey
 Displacement: 
 Bore and stroke: 
 Power: Premium –  Regular -
 Torque: Premium –  Regular –

J35A3
 2001–2002 Acura MDX
 Displacement: 
 Bore and stroke: 
 Power:  at 5800 rpm
 Torque:  at 4500 rpm

J35A4
 2002–2004 Honda Odyssey
 2003–2004 Honda Pilot
 Displacement: 
 Bore and stroke: 
 Power:  at 5400 rpm
 Torque:  at 4500 rpm
 Compression: 10.0:1
 Valve Train: 24-Valve SOHC VTEC
 Fuel control: Multi-point fuel injection

J35A5
 2003–2006 Acura MDX
 Displacement: 
 Bore and stroke: 
 Power:  at 5800 rpm
 Torque:  at 3500 rpm
 Compression: 10.0:1
 Valve Train: 24-Valve SOHC VTEC

J35A6
 2005–2010 Honda Odyssey Van, LX, EX
 2007+ (With revised bellhousing) Honda Odyssey 
 2005 Honda Pilot
 Displacement: 
 Bore and stroke: 
 Power:  at 5600 rpm
 Torque:  at 4500 rpm
 Compression: 10.0:1
 Valve Train: 24-Valve SOHC VTEC
 Fuel control: Multi-Point Fuel Injection

J35A7 – VCM 
Variable Cylinder Management Piston Oil Jets
 2005–2010 Honda Odyssey EX-L, Touring
 2007–2010 REVISED BELLHOUSING to Round Shape Honda Odyssey EX-L, Touring
 Displacement: 
 Bore and stroke: 
 Power:  at 5600 rpm 
 Torque:  at 4500 rpm
 Compression: 10.0:1
 Valve Train: 24-Valve SOHC i-VTEC

J35A8
 2004–2008 Honda Legend KB1 (Designation as "J35a" on block)
2005–2008 Acura RL
 2007–2008 Acura TL Type-S
 Displacement: 
 Bore and stroke: 
 Power:  at 6200 rpm
 Torque:  at 5000 rpm
 Compression: 11.0:1
 Valve Train: 24-Valve SOHC VTEC
 On the Ward's 10 Best Engines list for 2005, 2008 and 2009.

J35A9
 2006–2008 Honda Ridgeline
 2006–2008 Honda Pilot (4WD models)
 Displacement: 
 Bore and stroke: 
 Power:  at 5750 rpm 
 Torque: 
 Compression: 10.0:1
 Fuel control: Multi-point fuel injection; PGM-FI
 VTEC engagement: 4,400 rpm

J35S

J35S1
 2004–2007 Saturn Vue also referred to as GM L66
Displacement: 
 Bore and stroke: 
 Power:  at 5800 rpm
 Torque:  at 4500 rpm
Has revised bell housing Honda round style along with revised cylinder heads with single exit port
Renamed J35A5 from the 2003–2006 Acura MDX with different cam profiles; uses the h5 awd/fwd automatic transmission (and transfer case if applicable) along with the same wire harness and ECU

J35Z

The J35Z engines use a die-cast aluminum block with cast-iron cylinder sleeves.

J35Z1 – VCM 
 2006–2008 Honda Pilot (front-wheel drive only)
 Displacement: 
 Bore and stroke: 
 Compression: 10.5:1
 Power:  at 5750 rpm
 Torque:  at 4500 rpm
 Valvetrain: 24V SOHC i-VTEC
 Fuel control: Multi-point fuel injection, PGM-FI

J35Z2 – VCM 
 2008–2012 Honda Accord (except V6 6MT coupe)
 2010–2012 Honda Accord Crosstour / Honda Crosstour
 2013–2018  Acura RDX
 2007–2012 Honda Inspire (Japanese market, marked as J35A-80 280ps)
 Displacement: 
 Bore and stroke: 
 Compression: 10.5:1 
 Power:  at 6200 rpm (Acura RDX  at 6200 rpm)
 Torque:  at 5000 rpm (Acura RDX  at 5000 rpm)
 Valvetrain: 24V SOHC i-VTEC VCM
 Fuel control: Multi-point fuel injection; PGM-FI
 Redline: 6,800 rpm

J35Z3 
 2008–2012 Honda Accord 6MT Coupe 
 Displacement: 
 Bore and stroke: 
 Compression: 10.0:1
 Power:  at 6200 rpm
 Torque:  at 5000 rpm
 Valvetrain: 24v SOHC VTEC
 Fuel control: Multi-point fuel injection; PGM-FI

J35Z4 – VCM 

 2009–2015 Honda Pilot
 Displacement: 
 Bore and stroke: 
 Compression: 10.5:1
 Power:  at 5700 rpm
 Torque:  at 4800 rpm
 Valvetrain: 24v SOHC i-VTEC
 Fuel control: Multi-point fuel injection; PGM-FI

J35Z5 
 2009–2014 Honda Ridgeline
 Displacement: 
 Bore and stroke: 
 Compression: 10.0:1
 Power and torque:  at 5700 rpm;  at 4300 rpm
 Valvetrain: 24v SOHC VTEC
 Fuel control: Multi-point fuel injection; PGM-FI

J35Z6 
 2010–2014 Acura TSX V-6
 2009–2014 Acura TL (Non SH-AWD)
 Displacement: 
 Bore and stroke: 
 Compression: 11.2:1
 Power and torque:  at 6200 rpm;  at 5000 rpm
 Valvetrain: 24v SOHC VTEC
 Fuel control: Multi-point fuel injection; PGM-FI

J35Z8 – VCM 
 2011–2017 Honda Odyssey (North America)
 Displacement: 
 Bore and stroke: 
 Compression: 10.5:1
 Power and torque:  at 5700 rpm);  at 4800 rpm
 Valvetrain: 24v SOHC i-VTEC
 Fuel control: Multi-point fuel injection; PGM-FI

J35Y

J35Y1 – VCM 
 2013–2017 Honda Accord V-6
 2013–2015 Honda Accord Crosstour
 Displacement: 
 Bore and stroke: 
 Compression: 10.5:1
 Power:  at 6,200 rpm
 Torque:  at 4,900 rpm
 Valvetrain: 24v SOHC VTEC (Traditional VTEC cam profiles on front bank intake valves (cylinder 4,5,6) plus VCM on rear bank (cylinder 1,2,3)
 Ignition control type: ECU -Coil on Plug
 Fuel control: Multi-Point Fuel Injection
 Redline: 6,800 rpm
 Fuel Cut off: 7,300 rpm?
 VTEC engagement: 5,150 rpm

J35Y2 
 2013–2017 Honda Accord V-6 6MT (MANUAL ONLY)
 Displacement: 
 Bore and stroke: 
 Compression: 10.0:1
 Power:  at 6,200 rpm
 Torque:  at 5,300 rpm
 Valvetrain: 24v SOHC VTEC (Traditional VTEC cam profiles on Intake Valves)
 VTEC engagement: 4,900 rpm

J35Y4 – VCM 
 2014+ Acura RLX/Honda Legend
 Displacement: 
 Bore and stroke: 
 Compression: 11.5:1
 Power:  at 6,500 rpm
 Torque:  at 4,500 rpm
 Valvetrain: 24v SOHC VTEC (VTEC on intake valves only)
 Redline: 6,800 rpm
 Fuel cutoff: 7,200 rpm
 Induction/Fuel Delivery: Naturally Aspirated – Direct Injection

J35Y5 – VCM 
 2014–present Acura MDX
 Displacement: 
 Bore and stroke: 
 Compression: 11.5:1
Power:  at 6,200 rpm
Torque:  at 4,500 rpm
Valvetrain: 24v SOHC VTEC (VTEC on intake valves only)
Redline: 6,800 rpm
Fuel cutoff: 7,200 rpm
Induction/Fuel Delivery: Naturally Aspirated – Direct Injection

J35Y6 - VCM 
 2015–2020 Acura TLX
 2016–2022 Honda Pilot
 2017+ Honda Ridgeline
 2018+ Honda Odyssey (North America)
 2019+ Honda Passport
 Displacement: 
 Bore and stroke: 
 Compression: 11.5:1
Power: Acura TLX:  at 6,200 rpm
Torque: Acura TLX:  at 4,500 rpm
Power: Honda Pilot, Ridgeline, Passport, and Odyssey:  at 6,000 rpm
Torque: Honda Pilot, Ridgeline, Passport, and Odyssey:  at 4,700 rpm
Valvetrain: 24v SOHC i-VTEC (VTEC on intake valves only)
Redline: 6,800 rpm
Fuel cutoff: 7,200 rpm
Induction/Fuel Delivery: Naturally Aspirated – Direct Injection
VTEC engagement: 5,350 rpm

J35Y8 – VCM 
 2023+ Honda Pilot
 Displacement: 
Bore and stroke: 89 mm × 93 mm (3.50 in × 3.66 in)
Compression: 11.5:1
Power:  at 6,100 rpm
Torque:  at 5,000 rpm
Valve Train: 24-Valve DOHC with VTC

J37
The J37 uses a die-cast aluminum block with aluminum cylinder liners. Primarily due to the cylinder liners being made from aluminum instead of cast-iron the engine weighs less than the J35Z engines. The intake manifold is made from a cast magnesium alloy.

J37A1 
 2007–2013 Acura MDX
 Displacement: 
 Bore and stroke: 
 Compression: 11.0:1 (2007–2009); 11.2:1 (2010–2013)
 Power; torque:  at 6000 rpm;  at 5000 rpm (2007–2009)
 Power; torque:  at 6300 rpm;  at 4500 rpm (2010–2013)
 Valvetrain: 24v SOHC VTEC
 Fuel control: Multi-point fuel injection; PGM-FI

J37A2 
 2009–2012 Acura RL
 Displacement: 
 Bore and stroke: 
 Compression: 11.2:1
 Power; torque:  at 6300 rpm;  at 5000 rpm
 Valvetrain: 24v SOHC VTEC (intake and exhaust)
 Fuel control: Multi-point fuel injection; PGM-FI

J37A4 
 2008–2012 Honda Legend
 2009–2014 Acura TL SH-AWD
 Displacement: 
 Bore and stroke: 
 Compression: 11.2:1
 Power; torque:  at 6300 rpm;  at 5000 rpm
 Valvetrain: 24v SOHC VTEC (intake and exhaust)
 Fuel control: Multi-point fuel injection; PGM-FI

J37A5 
 2010–2013 Acura ZDX
 Displacement: 
 Bore and stroke: 
 Compression: 11.2:1
 Power; torque:  at 6300 rpm;  at 4500 rpm
 Valvetrain: 24v SOHC VTEC (intake and exhaust)
 Fuel control: Multi-point fuel injection; PGM-FI

See also
 List of Honda engines
 Engines used in GM Vehicles

References

External links 
 Car and Driver magazine, November 1996, p111

J
1996 introductions
V6 engines
Gasoline engines by model